Hickory Level is an unincorporated community in Carroll County, in the U.S. state of Georgia.

History
The first permanent settlement at Hickory Level was made in 1828. A post office called Hickory Level was established in 1837, and remained in operation until 1901. The community was named for its hickory groves on the relatively level town site.

References

Unincorporated communities in Carroll County, Georgia
Unincorporated communities in Georgia (U.S. state)